State Route 174 (SR 174) is a  route in St. Clair County in the north-central part of the state.  The western terminus of the route is at a junction with US 11 at Springville.  The eastern terminus of the route is at a junction with US 231 north of Pell City.

Route description
SR 174 is aligned along a two-lane road for its entirety. It begins at Springville, heading in a southeastward direction.  The route then passes through rural areas of St. Clair County en route to Odenville.  At Odenville, the route junctions US 411 and begins a  concurrency, turning to the southwest.  SR 174 then diverts from US 411, briefly resuming its southward trajectory.  North of Cook Springs, the route turns eastward, and continues its eastward orientation until it reaches its eastern terminus north of Pell City at US 231.

Major intersections

See also

References

External links

174
Transportation in St. Clair County, Alabama